This is a list of Nigerian films released in 1999.

Films

See also 

 List of Nigerian films

References 

1999
Nigeria
Films
1990s in Nigerian cinema